The Governor's Council (also known as the "Council of State" or simply "the Council") was the upper house of the colonial legislature (the House of Burgesses was the other house) in the Colony of Virginia from 1607 until the American Revolution in 1776. Consisting of 12 men who, after the 1630s were appointed by the British Sovereign, the Governor's Council also served as an advisory body to the Virginia Royal Governor and as the highest judicial body in the colony.

Organization
The Council consisted of no more than 12 men who served lifetime appointments to advise the governor and were, together with the governor, the highest court in the colony. Thus this body served as a legislative, executive, and judicial body. Modeled after the British House of Lords, the Governor's Council went through a definite evolution as the Virginia colony grew.

During much of the colonial period, the governor was absentee and the lieutenant governor was the beneficiary of the council's advice. When both were absent, the longest-serving member of the council, entitled the President of the council, would serve as acting governor.

During the Commonwealth of Oliver Cromwell between 1652 and 1660, the House of Burgesses elected the members of the council. After the restoration of the monarchy, the Crown again appointed the council, typically from among the landed and wealthy Virginia planters.

History

Virginia Company (1607–1624)
Virginia was founded under a charter granted by King James I to the Virginia Company in 1606. In 1607, the company's governing board in London appointed a small group of seven men to manage the day-to-day affairs of the colony on their behalf after the first settlers landed on the Virginia Peninsula. On April 26, 1607, the Council elected Captain Edward Maria Wingfield as its President, and he would later choose the site for the founding of the Jamestown settlement.

There was a lack of strong leadership among the council, which became apparent as soon as they landed at Jamestown in 1607. Internal dissension, allegations of lying, and the unexpected deaths of some councilors reduced the Governor's Council to a small group and finally only one person by the winter of 1608–1609. At that point, the Virginia Company essentially declared martial law and suspended the minimal semblance of collaborative government. The era of near-dictatorial power by the governor ended in 1618 following the king's issuance of the third royal charter.

As a result, a representative and consultative government was created. It was composed of the following establishments: a governor appointed by the Virginia Company of London, and a council of state, whose members were also chosen by the Virginia Company. The Governor's Council was charged with assisting the new governor in the execution of his duties, the first of which was, "the Advancement of the Honour and Service of God, and the Enlargement of his Kingdom amongst the Heathen People."  The other branch of government was a General Assembly that included the Council and a House of Burgesses that included two "burgesses" from every town, hundred, and particular plantation "chosen by the [free] inhabitants thereof". This new political structure necessarily reduced the power of the governor, a previously unilaterally powerful office that had been appointed for life. Under the new charter, sometimes called the Great Charter, Council decisions were made by majority vote, and the governor was only able to cast the deciding vote in the case of a tie. The General Assembly, which included both a popularly elected (albeit not universally enfranchised) and an Executive-Legislative hybrid based somewhat on the British system, was to be the voice of the colonists in Virginia, providing a check on the power of the governor.

Members of Virginia's first legislative assembly, which was a unicameral session including burgesses, the council, and the governor, gathered at the rough-hewn Anglican Jamestown Church on July 30, 1619. This was the first representative government in the European colonies in North America.  Before they adjourned, the assembly had adopted new laws for the colonists as well as programs designed to encourage settlement and improve economic growth in Virginia.

Royal colony (1624–1776)
In 1624, the Virginia Company's charter was revoked by King James I, and the Virginia Colony was transferred to royal authority as a crown colony.  The Council continued to be appointed and serve as advisors to the now royally-appointed governor and serve as the highest court of the colony. Until 1643, the council and burgesses continued to sit as a unicameral legislature. In the 1652–1660 period when Britain was not a monarchy due to the overthrow of King Charles I and execution in the English Civil War and erection of the Commonwealth of England under Oliver Cromwell, the members of the council, instead of being appointed by the head of state in London, were elected by the burgesses in Virginia.

After 1643, the General Assembly became bicameral and the Council was the upper house. The council continued to exercise legislative, administrative, and judicial functions.

Although the monarch appointed the members of the council, resident royal governors or lieutenant governors (who acted as governor in the absence of the royal governor) often made recommendations to the king when a vacancy occurred. The appointees were almost always among the most prominent planters and merchants in the colony. "The members of the Council were almost all wealthy and both socially and politically prominent. Independent wealth was required both for the social standing necessary for membership and also to permit the members to be absent from their families and plantations for long periods of time," according to the Encyclopedia Virginia.

During the years from 1643–1676, the Council met at the upper house of the General Assembly annually. From 1676–1776, the Governor's Council met about 8 times a decade as a legislative body, but starting in the middle of the 1600s the Council met quarterly for judicial sessions. Additionally, they convened as advisors to the governor at least annually, often for weeks at a time. In order to compensate the councilors for their time, starting in the 1640s the assembly granted them a dispensation from taxes. Encyclopedia Virginia states that "Membership on the governor's Council was the highest civil office to which natives or residents of the colony could normally aspire, and membership on the Council enabled wealthy and influential men to increase the wealth and influence of themselves and their families."

The extant written records of the council begin in 1680 and are housed at the Library of Virginia.

References

Colonial United States (British)
Government of Virginia
British colonial judges in the Americas
Colony of Virginia
State executive councils of the United States